Mettau was a municipality in the district of Laufenburg in the canton of Aargau in Switzerland.  On 1 January 2010 the municipalities of Hottwil, Etzgen, Mettau, Oberhofen and Wil merged into the municipality of Mettauertal.

References

Former municipalities of Aargau
Populated places disestablished in 2010